Tylice may refer to the following places in Poland:
Tylice, Lower Silesian Voivodeship (south-west Poland)
Tylice, Brodnica County in Kuyavian-Pomeranian Voivodeship (north-central Poland)
Tylice, Toruń County in Kuyavian-Pomeranian Voivodeship (north-central Poland)
Tylice, Warmian-Masurian Voivodeship (north Poland)